Henry Prince was an Australian politician.

He was a merchant, living in Sydney by 1851. He also had squatting interests, and was a partner in a Sydney mercantile firm. From 1858 to 1861 he served on the New South Wales Legislative Council.

References

Year of birth unknown
Year of death missing
Members of the New South Wales Legislative Council